When a patient has multiple abnormalities (multiple anomaly, multiple deformity), they have a congenital abnormality that can not be primarily identified with a single system of the body or single disease process.  Most medical conditions can have systemic sequelae, but multiple abnormalities occur when the effects on multiple systems is immediately obvious.

References

External links 

Congenital disorders